This is a list of notable fast-food chains in Canada. This list includes fast-food chains that are located in Canada, with the addition of those that are based or headquartered in other countries.

Fast-food chains in Canada

  A&W
  Arby's
  Baker's Dozen Donuts
  BarBurrito Canada
  La Belle Province
  Booster Juice
  Burger Baron
  Burger King
  Captain Submarine
  Carl's Jr.
  Chez Ashton
  Chicken Delight
  Chipotle Mexican Grill
  Chick-fil-A
  Cinnabon
  Coffee Time
  Country Style
  Dairy Queen
  Dixie Lee Fried Chicken
  Domino's
  Edo Japan
  Extreme Pita
  Five Guys
  Fryer's
  Greco Pizza
  Harvey's
  Hero Certified Burgers
  Jimmy the Greek
  Jollibee
  KFC
  Krispy Kreme
  Lafleur Restaurants
  Lick's Homeburgers
  Little Caesars
  Manchu Wok
  Mary Brown's
  McDonald's Canada
  Mr. Sub
  Mucho Burrito
  New York Fries
  Orange Julius
  Panda Express
  Papa John's
  Pita Pit
  Pizza Pizza
  Pizza Hut
  Popeyes Louisiana Kitchen
  Quiznos
  Robin's Donuts
  Second Cup
  St-Hubert
  Subway
  Swiss Chalet
  Taco Bell
  Taco del Mar
  Taco Time
  Thaï Express
  Tim Hortons
  Valentine
  Wendy's
  White Spot
  Yogen Früz

Pizza chains

See also
 List of Canadian restaurant chains
 List of fast food restaurant chains
 Lists of restaurants

References

 
Lists of restaurants